Southeast Borneo Federation was an autonomous area formed in the southeastern part of Indonesian island of Borneo by the Netherlands in 1948 as part of an attempt to re-establish the colony of the Dutch East Indies during the Indonesian National Revolution.  Southeast Borneo became a constituent part of the United States of Indonesia in 1949.  The Federation was dissolved on 18 April 1950 and combined with Great Dayak and Bandjar to form South Kalimantan Province.

Person of interests
 Mohammad Jamani

See also

History of Indonesia
Indonesian National Revolution
Indonesian regions

References

 
 
 
 

Indonesian National Revolution
States and territories established in 1948
States and territories disestablished in 1950